John Paul Powers (June 15, 1940 – January 12, 1978), born John Paul Theiss, was an American college and professional football player who was a tight end in the National Football League (NFL) for five seasons during the 1960s.

He was born in Harvard, Illinois.  He attended Campion Preparatory School in Prairie du Chien, Wisconsin.

Powers attended the University of Notre Dame, where he played for the Notre Dame Fighting Irish football team.  He graduated from Notre Dame with a bachelor's degree, and later earned a master's degree in rehabilitation administration from DePaul University.

He appeared in 49 regular season games during his five-year NFL career, mostly as a blocking lineman.

Powers subsequently was a player-coach for the Des Moines Warriors and coached the Chicago Owls football team of the Continental Football League.  He died on January 12, 1978; he was 37 years old.

See also
 List of DePaul University alumni
 List of University of Notre Dame alumni

References

1940 births
1978 deaths
American football tight ends
DePaul University alumni
Minnesota Vikings players
Notre Dame Fighting Irish football players
Pittsburgh Steelers players
People from Harvard, Illinois
People from Prairie du Chien, Wisconsin
Players of American football from Illinois
Players of American football from Wisconsin
Continental Football League players